Attrill is a surname. Notable people with the surname include:

Edwin Kemp Attrill, Australian theatre artist and activist
Louis Attrill (born 1975), British rower and Olympic gold medalist
Peter Attrill (born 1929), Australian sailor
William Attrill (1868–1939), French cricketer

English-language surnames